The 2018 Judo Grand Prix Tunis was held at the El Menzah Sports Palace in Tunis, Tunisia, from 19 to 21 January 2018.

Medal summary

Men's events

Women's events

Source Results

Medal table

References

External links
 

2018 IJF World Tour
 2018 Judo Grand Prix
Sport in Tunis
2018 in Tunisian sport